This is the list of characters appearing in the anime Kamisama Minarai: Himitsu no Cocotama.

Main characters

The primary main human protagonist of "Himitsu no Cocotama", Kokoro is a 5th grade student who lives in the town of Aozora. Her wish is to be less clumsy. 

The second human protagonist of "Himitsu no Cocotama", Nozomi is also a 5th grade student who had made a contract with Vivit, her partner Cocotama. She makes her first appearance in Episode 26.

The third human protagonist of '"Himitsu no Cocotama", Hikari is a 5th grade student who studies at another school. She makes her first appearance in Episode 80.

Cocotamas
Cocotamas are small furry animal-like creatures born from regular objects whose owners have taken good care of them. If a Cocotama collects enough Happy Stars, he/she will be recognized and become a full-pledged god and must depart to the Cocotama World to watch over the humans.

"Cocotama" is derived from the Japanese words "kokoro", and "tamashii". The concept of the characters is based on the tsukumogami, guardian angels, real or mythological animals and Kuroko.

Cocotamas Contracted to Kokoro

The secondary main protagonist of "Himitsu no Cocotama", he is an Orange Cocotama born from Kokoro's Colored pencil that she owned when she was 3, and is referred as the "Colored Pencil God". He is reckless with his luck, even though his magic fails most of the time, giving him bad luck.

The third main protagonist of "Himitsu no Cocotama", she is a Pink Cocotama born from Kokoro's Piano that she played when she was 3, and is referred as the "Piano Goddess".

Oshaki is a Light Blue Cocotama born from one of the Encyclopedias Kokoro's father owns, and is referred as the "Book Goddess".

Geracho is a Green Cocotama born from the Yotsuba's family's flat screen television, and is referred as the "Television God".

Kirarise is a Mauve Cocotama born from Misato's treasured lipstick given to her by Koichi, and is referred as the "Lipstick Goddess".

Mogutan is a large Yellow Cocotama born from a fork that belonged and used by the Yotsuba Family, and is referred as the "Fork God". He loves to eat food.

 and 

Appearing in Episode 14, Sarine and Parine are twin Cocotamas both born from a shampoo bottle and a hair conditioner bottle the Yotsubas use respectively and they are referred to as the "Shampoo Gods". Both their names are based on the Japanese word "Sappari", meaning "refreshing". Sarine is outgoing, and Parine is shy and worries a lot.

Appearing in Episode 15, Mishil is a Red Cocotama born from the Yotsuba Family's mailbox and is referred as the "Mail Goddess".

Appearing in Episode 127, Kanna is a blue Cocotama who has ascended and became a true goddess, born from a clock tower at a park and is referred as the "Clock Goddess". Though she has ascended to live in the Cocotama World, her Adult Pants wasn't received and in an incident, was lost into the human world. Due to this, she uses her old Egg Underpants to search for her own Adult Pants. She is a hardworking girl and very serious about time, notifying everyone about the hour. She also looks down on Apprentice Cocotamas, but later on she realized on how much they persevere on their work in making people happy. Her mark in her pants is a pink alarm clock.

Cocotamas Contracted to Nozomi

Vivit is a female light teal Cocotama born from Nozomi's Locket Pendant, and is referred as the "Locket Goddess". Her name is shortened from Vivid Heart.

Renge is a male purple Cocotama born from Nozomi's paintbrush, and is referred as the "Paintbrush God". His mark on his pants is a magenta paintbrush and his name is a pun of the word "Arrange".

Pinco is a female orange Cocotama born from Nozomi's money purse, and is referred as the "Purse Goddess". Her mark on her pants is an orange shopping bag.

Nicolie is a female light yellow baby Cocotama born from Nozomi's baby towel, and is referred as the "Towel Goddess". Her mark in her pants is a yellow-green flower.

Cocotamas Contracted to Hikari

Raichi is a male sky blue unicorn-like Cocotama born from Hikari's prized playing cards that she used during her street performance, and is referred as the "Card God". His mark on his pants is a blue clock. While he is laid-back yet clumsy, he had lost most of his memories due to an incident that made him and Hikari forget about each other, per the contract rules. As a result, Raichi is now tied to a temporary contract, and if he doesn't make Hikari's wish come true in time, he and Hikari will forget each other once more, and he will return to the playing cards he was born from.

Pikota is a male emerald green Cocotama born from a Printing press and is referred as the "Printing Press God". If one removes the pin on his head, he will malfunction.

Chocolancy is female reddish magenta Cocotama born from a randoseru and is referred as the "Randoseru Goddess". Like Picota, Chocolancy came to the CocoTre House to practice her skills as an apprentice god and met with Raichi. She familiarize with him as an Older Brother, much to his dismay and is very determined. Because of her determination, she can challenge anything thrown at her and has exceptional human strength. Her favorite food is Chocolate. She later left the CocoTre House later in the series.

Pocaline is a female Orange Cocotama born from a pair of winter Gloves Rin once owned and is referred as the "Glove Goddess".

Pocaline's older brother, Heaton is a male Dark Orange Cocotama born from a winter scarf that Rin uses and is referred as the "Scarf God".

Straytama Trio
The  are a group of Cocotama who were born from the playground equipment that the kids use. Noratama means "Stray Soul" in Japanese.

Yurano is a female feline-like Magenta colored Cocotama who is born from the Swings of an abandoned playground, and is referred to as the "Swing Goddess". 

Tokumaru is a male bird-like blue colored Cocotama who is born from the seesaw of an abandoned playground, and is referred to as the "Seesaw God". 

Mukitetsu is a Dog-Like male teal colored Cocotama who is born from the horizontal bar of an abandoned playground, and is referred to as the "High Bar God".

Other Cocotamas

Tama-Sennin is one of the leaders of the Cocotamas and the oldest who ever lived; he was born from a flute. He is colored gray with a long beard, wears a loincloth and wields a wooden staff.

Appearing in Episode 11, he is a brown Cocotama who is born from an abacus in the Candy Store and is referred to as the "Abacus God". 

Appearing in Episode 24, Dashimaki is a yellow male Cocotama who is born from a study desk and is referred as the "Desk God". 

Appearing in Episode 38, Yozepp is a green male Cocotama born from a Bookcase and is referred as the "Bookcase God".

Appearing in Episode 38, Sham is pink female Cocotama born from a Chopsticks and is referred as the "Chopsticks Goddess".

Appearing in Episode 38, Michel is purple female Cocotama born from a Magnifying glass and is referred as the "Magnifying Glass Goddess".

Appearing in Episode 41, Niche is a green male Cocotama born from the encyclopedias in the town library and is referred as the "Book God".  

Appearing in Episode 41, Hotney is a yellow female Cocotama who is born from a Digital Medical thermometer and is referred as the "Nurse Goddess".

Appearing in Episode 44, Tototon is a female Cocotama born from a Cutting board and referred as the "Cutting Board Goddess".

Appearing in Episode 50, Ukero is a male Cocotama born from a Baseball glove and referred as the "Baseball Glove God".

Appearing in Episode 58, Mush-Mukunyu is a male Cocotama born from a Drawing board and referred as the "Drawing Board God".

Appearing in Episode 71, Yuuki is a snowman Cocotama born from a Shovel and referred as the "Shovel God".

Appearing in Episode 79, Cinemaru is a black male Cocotama born from a Movie projector and referred as the "Movie Projector God".

The movie's main protagonist and later appearing in the anime of Episode 107, Tepple is a female pink Cocotama born from a pair of Dance Shoes that Mai once owned and is referred as the "Dance Shoes Goddess".

Appearing in the movie and later appearing in the anime of Episode 127, Coco-Sennin is one of the leaders of the Cocotamas.

Appearing in the movie and later appearing in the anime of Episode 139, Hapipina is a female Cocotama who is born from a Firecracker and is referred as the "Firecracker Goddess".

Appearing in the Episode 91, Patarina is a purple female Cocotama who is born from a Feather duster and is referred as the "Feather Duster Goddess". Her mark in her pants is a blue sparkle.

Appearing in the Episode 102, Kurun is a light green female Cocotama who is born from a Dress and is referred as the "Dress Goddess".

Appearing in the Episode 113, Bells is a green male Cocotama who is born from a Sled and is referred as the "Sled God".

Appearing in Episode 116, Awawa is a gold Cocotama who was born from a rainbow-colored soap and is referred as the "Soap Goddess".

Appearing in Episode 127, Tama-Shine is one of the leaders of the Cocotamas and the current ruler of the Cocotama World who is born from a stamp and is referred as the "Stamp Goddess". 

Appearing in the Episode 131, Suie is a yellow bird-like female Cocotama born from a Bicycle and is referred as the "Bicycle Goddess". Her mark in her pants is a light blue wave.

Appearing in the Episode 132, Suie's older brother, he is a green bird-like male Cocotama born from a Bicycle and is referred as the "Bicycle God". He wears yellow-colored pants.

Appearing in Episode 139, Cala is a green female Cocotama who was born from a crayon and is referred as the "Crayon Goddess".

Sub characters

Yotsuba Family

Kokoro's younger brother.  

Kokoro's father and a renowned architect at a housing company.

Kokoro's mother and both a worker and owner of a knitting and fabric store in town.

Kokoro's grandmother and Misato's mother, who taught Kokoro about the importance of things and treasuring them.

Kokoro's grandfather.

The pet cat owned by the Yotsubas.

Hidamari Elementary School

One of Kokoro's two best friends in school, who is part of the Basketball Club. 

Also one of Kokoro's friends in school.  

One of Kokoro's classmates who is a fan of anything supernatural. 

Kokoro's homeroom teacher in school.

Others

The main human character making her first appearance in the movie, Mai is a 5th grade student from Suzuran Elementary School.

References

Cocotama
Cocotama